The 1987 Pan American Games, officially known as the X Pan American Games, were a continental multi-sport event held in Indianapolis, United States, from August 7 to August 23, 1987. At the Games, 4,453 athletes selected from 38 National Olympic Committees (NOCs) participated in events in 27 sports. Twenty-seven nations earned medals during the competition, and fourteen won at least one gold medal.

Medal table 

The ranking in this table is based on medal counts published by several media organizations. By default, the table is ordered by the number of gold medals won by the athletes representing a nation. (In this context, a nation is an entity represented by a NOC). The number of silver medals is taken into consideration next and then the number of bronze medals. If nations are still tied, equal ranking is given and they are listed alphabetically by IOC country code.

To sort this table by nation, total medal count, or any other column, click on the  icon next to the column title.

Notes 

  Some sources appoint that the United States earned 168 gold medals, 118 silver medals and 83 bronze medals, instead of 169, 120 and 81, respectively. This would result in a total of 369 medals.
  Some sources appoint that Canada earned 57 bronze medals, instead of 56. This would result in a total of 162 medals.
  Therefore, according to some sources, 326 gold medals, 318 silver medals and 375 bronze medals were awarded during the Games, instead of 327, 319 and 373, respectively. This would result in the same total number of 1019 medals awarded.

References 

General

 

Specific

See also 

Medal table
Pan American Games medal tables